Harold John Smith (August 24, 1916 – January 28, 1994) was an American actor. He is credited in over 300 film and television productions, and was best known for his role as Otis Campbell, the town drunk on CBS's The Andy Griffith Show and for voicing Owl in the first four original Winnie the Pooh shorts (the first three of which were combined into the feature film The Many Adventures of Winnie the Pooh) and later The New Adventures of Winnie the Pooh. He also did a cameo in The Apartment as a drunken Santa Claus.

Early life
Harold John Smith was born on August 24, 1916 in Petoskey, Michigan. He was the son of Jay D. Smith (1875-1969) and Emma Smith (nee Ploof) (1881-1977). He was the third of four children and he had three siblings: two older sisters, Kathleen (1912-2005) and Bernadeen (1914-2002) and one younger brother, Glenford “Glen” (1918-2003). After graduation from high school, Smith worked from 1936 to 1943 as a DJ and voice talent for WIBX Radio in Utica, New York. 

Being an avid flyer, Smith enlisted in the United States Army Air Forces in 1943 and was stationed in the Philippines with the Army's Special Services Division. While in Manila, he was made assistant manager of the enlisted men's club at the Far East Air Force (FEAF) headquarters. As such, he was responsible for planning and directing shows for the entertainment of his fellow troops. His own performing skills were utilized as well in a show titled Strictly from Hunger. He was discharged from the service in 1946 as a Sergeant and was awarded the American Campaign Medal, the Asiatic–Pacific Campaign Medal, the World War II Victory Medal and the Philippine Liberation Medal. 

After the war, he traveled to Hollywood and appeared on many television series such as I Married Joan, Fury, The People's Choice, The Texan, Rescue 8, Dennis the Menace, The Adventures of Ozzie and Harriet, The Donna Reed Show, National Velvet and The Red Skelton Show.

Career

The Andy Griffith Show
Smith's best-remembered on-screen character was Otis Campbell, the town drunk on The Andy Griffith Show, during most of the series' run from 1960 to 1967. When intoxicated, he would often comically let himself into his regular jail cell—using the key which was stored within reach of the two comfortable jail rooms— and "sleep off" the effects of alcohol. Deputy Barney Fife would often become irritated with Otis and would attempt to either sober him up or rehabilitate him in several episodes.

Hal Smith was the opposite of his character. According to longtime friends Andy Griffith and Don Knotts, he did not drink in real life. The Otis character stopped appearing in the sitcom towards the end of the series because of sponsor concerns regarding the comic portrayal of excessive drinking. Smith appeared as Calver Weems in the Don Knotts comedy The Ghost and Mr. Chicken (1966), playing essentially the same town drunk character.

Smith would play Otis one more time in the television movie Return to Mayberry (1986). In the television movie, Otis is the town's ice cream truck driver and is reported to have been "sober for years.” Smith later used his Otis Campbell character in commercial spots for the Mothers Against Drunk Driving organization, and he appeared as Otis in Alan Jackson's music video "Don't Rock the Juke Box.”

Other performances
In 1957, Smith played Rollin Daggett in the role of a newspaper man in the early days of Mark Twain in the "Fifteen Paces to Fame" episode of Death Valley Days. He made at least one appearance in the TV series Perry Mason, the episode titled "The Case of the Treacherous Toupee", (season 4, episode 1), in 1960. He had a small role as a restaurant manager in the 10/01/1960 Leave It to Beaver episode "Beaver Won't Eat". Smith had a cameo role as the Mayor of Boracho in The Great Race in 1965. He played the industrialist Hans Spear on CBS's sitcom Hogan's Heroes ("The Swing Shift", season 2, episode 21).

He portrayed King Theseus of Rhodes in The Three Stooges Meet Hercules (1965) and later provided various voices for the cartoon series The New 3 Stooges.

In 1967, he played John Wilson in the 1967 episode "The Man Who Didn't Want Gold" of the syndicated Western series Death Valley Days and Mr. Weber in The Lucy Show.

In 1969, Smith had a cameo role as a drunk driver in the Adam-12 episode "Log 51: A Jumper – Code Two". Also in 1969, he appeared in the Petticoat Junction episode "The Great Race". He played Jug Gunderson, a moonshiner that helped the Cannonball train win the aforementioned race. Though his character was never seen drinking or drunk, by the end of the episode, he makes an oath to himself to stop drinking and reform.

In the mid-1960s, Smith also had a morning children's show on the Los Angeles television station KHJ called The Pancake Man, sponsored by the International House of Pancakes (IHOP) restaurant chain. He reprised the role of the Pancake Man as "Kartoon King" in the 1971 episode of The Brady Bunch, titled "The Winner". He also played Mother Goose in the X-rated animated feature film Once Upon a Girl in 1976.

Voice acting
Smith also worked extensively as a voice actor in animated films and television series. His first voice credit was as "Pepe", a boxing rooster, in Walter Lantz's cartoon "The Bongo Punch" in 1957.
Beginning in the late 1950s with such shows as The Huckleberry Hound Show and Quick Draw McGraw, Smith became one of the most prolific voice actors in Hollywood, eventually working with most of the major studios and production companies, such as Hanna-Barbera, Walt Disney, Warner Bros., the Mirisch Corporation, and Sid and Marty Krofft, with voice roles on such series as The Flintstones in which he mostly did the voices of Texas millionaires such as Fred's rich uncle Tex, Pink Panther, The Many Adventures of Winnie the Pooh, Mickey Mouse, Yogi Bear and Looney Tunes.

In 1962, he voiced Taurus, the Scots-accented mechanic of the spaceship Starduster for the series Space Angel. According to the book: Space Patrol, missions of daring in the name of early television, "It's rumored that Gene Roddenberry was a huge fan of the show and patterned Star Trek's engineer, Mr. Scott, after McCloud's Scottish sidekick, Taurus". He also did voices for the Hong Kong Phooey series. In 1977, he was the voice of Grandpa Josiah in the cartoon special, Halloween Is Grinch Night. He was also very active with doing voices in 1980s; he was Sludge in The Smurfs, Goofy in Mickey's Christmas Carol, in Disney's DuckTales he did the voices of Scrooge McDuck's rival Flintheart Glomgold and the absent-minded scientist Gyro Gearloose and in Frog And Toad are Friends and Frog And Toad Together he also did the voice of Toad.

Smith also voiced the Disney cartoon character Goofy after Pinto Colvig died in 1967. Additionally, he provided the voice of Owl in the three original Winnie the Pooh featurettes (Winnie the Pooh and the Honey Tree, Winnie the Pooh and the Blustery Day and Winnie the Pooh and Tigger Too) and The Many Adventures of Winnie the Pooh in 1977. In the 1960s, he was one of the most sought after voice actors in Hollywood. From 1959 till 1975, he provided the voices for Goliath, Davey's dad and many other characters in Davey and Goliath. From 1960 to 1961, he was the voice of Elmer Fudd after Arthur Q. Bryan died. In 1963, he voiced Dr. Todd Goodheart, Belly Laguna, and Dr. Von Upp in The Funny Company cartoon series. From 1964 to 1966, he was the voice of Yappee in the Hanna-Barbera cartoon shorts Yippee, Yappee and Yahooey. He was also the voice of Cosgoode Creeps, Asa Shanks, the Farmer and Mr. Greenway, on Scooby-Doo, Where are You!.

In 1981, he reprised his role as Owl and voiced Winnie-the-Pooh in the short Winnie the Pooh Discovers the Seasons, replacing Sterling Holloway, who had provided the voice of the character for many years. He then voiced the two characters in Winnie the Pooh and a Day for Eeyore in 1983, as well as Disney Channel's television series Welcome to Pooh Corner. On the television series The New Adventures of Winnie the Pooh in 1988, Jim Cummings took over as Pooh while Smith continued playing Owl. The two voice actors sometimes rotated the voice of Winnie the Pooh. In 1991, Smith provided the voice of Philippe the Horse in the Disney film Beauty and the Beast before his death in 1994.

In 1985, Hal voiced Norman Harper, a sick father of wife Jennifer Walters (voiced by D.J. Harner), in a radio drama entitled "House Guest". It aired on the Focus on the Family daily broadcast on November 23 (the day before Thanksgiving) of that year. He went to voice other roles for other Focus audio presentations, and starting in 1987, Smith was the voice of the main character John Avery Whittaker on Focus on the Family's longest-running radio drama Adventures in Odyssey, which debuted that year. He was responsible for much of the cast joining the show after he signed on (including Katie Leigh, Will Ryan, Walker Edmiston, Earl Boen, Dave Madden and others), and he continued recording episodes until a few weeks before his death, even while his health deteriorated. In an Andy Griffith Fan Interview, published after he died, Smith said that Adventures in Odyssey was one of the most gratifying things he had done in his life. Additionally, he voiced dozens of other characters during the 253 episodes in which he participated. His role of Whit was later filled by Paul Herlinger in 1996 and then Andre Stojka in 2009, after his death.

Hal voiced Joe McGee in "The Old Man and the Sea Duck" episode of TaleSpin.

Smith was also very active working in television commercials as various characters. He provided on-screen promotion for 3 Musketeers, United Van Lines, Hickory Farms, Toyota, Green Giant, General Mills, Mattel, Kellogg's, Pizza Hut, Chicken of the Sea, Ivory soap, Doctor Ross Dog Food, Pioneer Chicken, Bell Telephone Company, Coca-Cola, Chef Boyardee and hundreds of other advertising sponsors.

Personal life
Smith was married to Louise C. Smith from 1936 until her death in 1992. They had a son named Terry.

Death
After his wife died in 1992, Smith's own health began to deteriorate rapidly. On January 28, 1994, at the age of 77, Smith died from an apparent heart attack. Don Pitts, his longtime agent, said that Smith died at his home in Santa Monica, California, while he was listening to a nightly drama hour on radio. He is interred in the mausoleum at Woodlawn Cemetery in Santa Monica.

Partial filmography

Live-action

Film

Television

Voice roles

Film

Television

Video games

Radio

References

External links

 
 
 
 
 

1910s births
1994 deaths
American Congregationalists
American radio DJs
American male film actors
American male radio actors
American male television actors
American male voice actors
Audiobook narrators
Warner Bros. Cartoons voice actors
Hanna-Barbera people
Burials at Woodlawn Memorial Cemetery, Santa Monica
Male actors from Los Angeles
United States Army personnel of World War II
United States Army soldiers
20th-century American male actors
20th-century American musicians